Gnoma luzonica is a species of beetle in the family Cerambycidae. It was described by Wilhelm Ferdinand Erichson in 1834, originally as G. luzonicum. It is known from the Philippines.

Subspecies
 Gnoma luzonica bilara Dillon & Dillon, 1950
 Gnoma luzonica luzonica Erichson, 1834
 Gnoma luzonica transiens Kriesche, 1936

References

Lamiini
Beetles described in 1834